Acalolepta subpustulata is a species of beetle in the family Cerambycidae. It was described by Stephan von Breuning in 1960. It is known from Sumatra.

References

Acalolepta
Beetles described in 1960